Faustini is an Italian surname. Notable people with the surname include:

Andrea Faustini (born 1994), Italian singer and finalist in the eleventh series of the UK The X Factor in 2014
Arnaldo Faustini (1872–1944), Italian polar geographer, writer and cartographer
Giovanni Faustini (1615–1651), Italian librettist and opera impresario. Brother of Marco Faustini
Marco Faustini (1606-1676), Italian theatrical impresario. Brother of Giovanni Faustini
Modesto Faustini (1839–1891), Italian painter
Osvaldo Faustini (born 1956), Italian former long-distance runner

See also
Faustini (crater), a lunar crater that lies near the south pole of the Moon

Italian-language surnames